Cap 24 was a French regional television channel, available in Paris and Île-de-France region, broadcasting from the Eiffel Tower. It began broadcasting on 20 March 2008.

History
On 5 June 2007, the Conseil supérieur de l'audiovisuel (CSA) gave Cap 24 (under the name Côté Seine), one of the four regional slots on the Télévision Numérique Terrestre (TNT) service. The channel changed to its current name at its launch on 20 March 2008.

References

External links

Television stations in France
Television channels and stations established in 2008
Mass media in Paris
Television channels and stations disestablished in 2010
2008 establishments in France
2010 disestablishments in France